George Quarles (born March 24, 1967) is an American football coach who is currently the head coach at East Tennessee State University, a role he has held since December of 2021. Prior to East Tennessee State, he was the associate head coach, offensive coordinator, and quarterbacks coach at Furman University, where he played college football. Before he joined the Furman coaching staff, Quarles was the head coach at Maryville High School in Tennessee from 1999 to 2016, where he recorded a 250–16 record.

Head coaching record

College

References

External links
 
 East Tennessee State profile
 Furman profile

1967 births
Living people
American football wide receivers
East Tennessee State Buccaneers football coaches
Furman Paladins football players
Furman Paladins football coaches
High school football coaches in Georgia (U.S. state)
High school football coaches in South Carolina
High school football coaches in Tennessee